José Maria Marcos or simply Marcos (born 12 June 1970 in São Paulo) is a former Brazilian football player.

References

1970 births
Footballers from São Paulo
Living people
Brazilian footballers
FC KAMAZ Naberezhnye Chelny players
Brazilian expatriate footballers
Expatriate footballers in Russia
Russian Premier League players
Ceará Sporting Club players

Association football midfielders